Jordan Nolan (born June 23, 1989) is a Canadian actor and former professional ice hockey forward. He was selected by the Los Angeles Kings in the seventh round (186th overall) of the 2009 NHL Entry Draft. 

Nolan won the Stanley Cup twice with the Kings in 2012 and 2014, and was also a member of the St. Louis Blues Stanley Cup-winning team of 2019.

Playing career

Junior
Nolan began his career with the Erie Otters of the Ontario Hockey League (OHL) in 2005–06, scoring just three goals in 33 games. He then spent two seasons with the Windsor Spitfires from 2006-2008, followed by two seasons with the Sault Ste. Marie Greyhounds from 2008-2010.

In his first season as a Greyhound, Nolan would lead the offensively-challenged and dead last OHL team with 16 goals and 27 assists in 64 games. He played in all situations, including acting as an enforcer for the team during the 2008-09 season. The following year Nolan would put up 23 goals and 25 assists in 49 games for the Greyhounds before joining the Ontario Reign of the ECHL to finish off his junior career.

Professional
Nolan was selected by the Los Angeles Kings in the seventh round (186th overall) in the 2009 NHL Entry Draft. After the Greyhounds' season ended in 2010, Nolan was sent to the Ontario Reign of the ECHL. He only played three games with the team. On October 5, 2010, Nolan was signed by the Los Angeles Kings to a three-year, entry-level contract.

He spent the next two seasons with the Manchester Monarchs of the American Hockey League (AHL), where he totaled 14 goals  and 39 points in 115 games. On February 11, 2012, Nolan was recalled to join the Los Angeles Kings, and was assigned uniform number 71, the first player on the team to wear the number. He played his first NHL game that same day, a loss to the New York Islanders. He scored his first NHL goal the following day in a victory over the Dallas Stars. Throughout his career, Nolan would also be known for his scraps with opposing players, occasionally serving in the role of an enforcer.

On May 6, 2012, Nolan scored his first career NHL playoff goal, helping the Kings sweep the St. Louis Blues in the Western Conference Semifinals of the 2012 Stanley Cup playoffs. He later won the Stanley Cup with the Kings during the 2012 Stanley Cup Finals and 2014 Stanley Cup Finals

On September 26, 2017, Nolan was waived by the Kings. He was claimed off waivers by the Buffalo Sabres the following day. In the 2017–18 season, on October 24, 2017, nearly a month after his debut with the Sabres, Nolan participated in what was his 300th game in the NHL. The Sabres were victorious in their home arena with a final score of 1-0 against the Detroit Red Wings.

Having left the Sabres as a free agent after just one season, Nolan agreed to a one-year, two-way contract with the St. Louis Blues on July 5, 2018. He returned to the Blues on a one-year extension, and spent the entire 2019–20 season playing with their minor league affiliate, the San Antonio Rampage, for whom he served as Captain before again becoming an unrestricted free agent.

Having left the Blues after two seasons within the organization, Nolan subsequently signed a one-year AHL contract with the Wilkes-Barre/Scranton Penguins, affiliate to the Pittsburgh Penguins, on December 5, 2020. In the pandemic delayed 2020-21 season, Nolan played 2 games with Wilkes-Barre as an alternate captain, registering 1 assist, before he mutually agreed to part ways with the Penguins on March 6, 2021.

On October 12, 2021, Nolan joined the Los Angeles Kings front office staff, signaling the end of his playing career. He will serve as a Community Relations Consultant and Ambassador.

Post-playing career
Nolan, alongside his brother Brandon and Jon Mirasty, portray a trio of hockey players who share the first name Jim (Jordan is Jim #3) in the 2022 TV series Shoresy. They are a spoof of the Hanson Brothers from Slap Shot.

Playing style and criticism

While with the Sault Ste. Marie Greyhounds as a nineteen-year-old, Nolan was involved in an altercation with R.J. Mahalak of the Plymouth Whalers in March 2009. In an unprovoked attack, Nolan punched Mahalak twice in the face, giving him a concussion as he fell to the ice and struck his head. As a result, Nolan received a 20-game suspension by the OHL. "They believed it was vicious enough for a 20-game suspension and they felt it was fortunate the player (Mahalak) wasn't hurt more severely", said Greyhounds' general manager Dave Torrie. "(But) that was one of the scariest things I've ever seen. He (Nolan) went after a player who wasn't going to fight. You have to pay consequences," said Whalers' head coach and general manager Mike Vellucci of the incident.
In the NHL, Nolan has faced disciplinary action from the league on multiple occasions. On March 24, 2013, Nolan was fined $1,436.94 by the league for a cross-check to the head of Vancouver Canucks' forward Henrik Sedin. The fine was the maximum allowed under the league's Collective Bargaining Agreement.

In a game against the Edmonton Oilers on March 9, 2014, Nolan sucker punched unsuspecting Oilers' forward Jesse Joensuu after a scrum near the end of the second period. At the time of the punch, Joensuu's hands were being held by a linesman. Nolan was assessed a double-minor for the incident and was scheduled for a disciplinary hearing with NHL Director of Player Safety Brendan Shanahan the following day.  On March 10, the NHL announced a one-game suspension for Nolan as a result of the incident.

Personal life
Both Nolan's father, Ted Nolan, and his brother, Brandon Nolan, have played in the National Hockey League. Ted has also served as the head coach of the Buffalo Sabres and the New York Islanders.

Nolan is First Nation Ojibwe on his father's side having grown up in the Garden River First Nation near Sault Ste. Marie, Ontario, Canada. He is also a First Nation Maliseet on his mother's side from St. Mary's First Nation in Fredericton, New Brunswick, Canada.  As a child, Nolan learned to play hockey in the outdoors on a handmade rink that his father built for him and his brothers. Nolan along with his father and brother created the Nolan's First Nations Hockey School in 2013, for the purpose of teaching First Nations youth what it takes to be successful and how they can achieve greater things in life. Nolan continuously sets aside time during this busy schedule to visit First Nation communities around Canada.

While playing for the Windsor Spitfires in 2006 to 2008, Nolan met his future wife whom he married in 2015.

Career statistics

Awards and honours

References

External links
 
 

1989 births
Living people
Buffalo Sabres players
Canadian ice hockey centres
Erie Otters players
First Nations sportspeople
Ice hockey people from Ontario
Los Angeles Kings draft picks
Los Angeles Kings players
Manchester Monarchs (AHL) players
Ojibwe people
Ontario Reign (ECHL) players
People from Algoma District
St. Louis Blues players
San Antonio Rampage players
Sault Ste. Marie Greyhounds players
Stanley Cup champions
Wilkes-Barre/Scranton Penguins players
Windsor Spitfires players